Joaquín Bernardo Rubert (1772–1817) was a Spanish painter, active in Valencia and mainly painting still life floral arrangements.

External links
 Valencia Art exhibit.

1772 births
1817 deaths
People from Valencia
18th-century Spanish painters
18th-century Spanish male artists
Spanish male painters
19th-century Spanish painters
19th-century Spanish male artists
Spanish floral still life painters